Axel Birnbaum (born 15 March 1966) is an Austrian fencer. He competed in the individual épée event at the 1988 Summer Olympics. His father, Udo Birnbaum, also competed at the Olympics for Austria.

References

External links
 

1966 births
Living people
Austrian male fencers
Austrian épée fencers
Olympic fencers of Austria
Fencers at the 1988 Summer Olympics
Fencers from Vienna